Tom Sullivan (born March 27, 1947) is an American singer, actor, writer, and motivational speaker. Blind since infancy, he has been a public advocate for assistive services for the blind, and research into treatments for blindness.

Personal life
Sullivan was born and raised in Boston, Massachusetts, the son of Marie C. (née Kelly) and Thomas J. Sullivan, who owned a saloon. His premature birth caused him to need oxygen treatment while in an incubator. Though the treatment saved his life, he was given too much oxygen, which left him permanently blind. (This condition is now known as retinopathy of prematurity.)

Sullivan had a close and lifelong friendship with actress Betty White and her husband Allen Ludden; they met in 1968 while they were performing on Cape Cod. Sullivan and White co-wrote a book, Leading Lady, about Sullivan's first seeing eye dog, who lived with White after being retired.

Career
Sullivan has worked as an author, composer, motivational speaker, and singer, as well as an actor, director, and producer. Sullivan sang "The Star-Spangled Banner", the national anthem of the United States, at Super Bowl X, and the 1976 Indianapolis 500.

He played a recently blinded soldier in a 1976 episode of M*A*S*H, which led to additional acting roles. He also starred as a blind business owner in the WKRP in Cincinnati episode "To Err is Human". He had a recurring role on Highway to Heaven as Frank Riley, who ultimately marries Priscilla Barnes's character. Among the songs Sullivan has written and performed are "All the Colors Of the Heart", which was used as the theme for his debut episode of Highway to Heaven.

If You Could See What I Hear, a 1982 movie based on his time in college, was directed by Eric Till and starred Marc Singer as Sullivan.

Awards
Sullivan won the American Foundation for the Blind's "Helen Keller Achievement Award" in 1997.

Discography

Studio albums
{| class="wikitable plainrowheaders" style="text-align:center"
|+ List of albums, with selected details and chart positions
! scope="col" rowspan="2" | Title
! scope="col" rowspan="2" | Album details
! scope="col" colspan="1" | Peak chart positions
|-
! scope="col" style="width:3em; font-size:90%"| AUS
|-
! scope="row" | If You Could See What I Hear
|
 Released: 1972
 Format: LP
 Label: Perception
| —
|-
! scope="row" | Yes I'm Ready / Tom Sullivan
|
 Released: 1976
 Format: LP
 Label: ABC Music (ABCD-967)
| 97 
|}

Singles

Selected television and movie credits
Acting filmographyTouched by an Angel (in episode "Then Sings my Soul" as Clarence), 1999Renegade (in episode "Love Hurts" as Denny Martin), 1996Designing Women (in episode "One Sees, the Other Doesn't" as Danny), 1989Highway to Heaven (two episodes, as Frank Riley)Knight Rider (in episode "Knight Song" as Charley Connors), 1985Search for Tomorrow (as Michael Kendall), 1983Mork & Mindy (in episode "Mork Learns to See" as Tom Bickley), 1980Airport '77 (as Steve), 1977M*A*S*H (in episode "Out of Sight, Out of Mind" as Tom Straw), 1976WKRP in Cincinnati (in episode "To Err is Human" as Hester Sherman), 1982Fame (in episode "Solo Song" as blind vocal coach), 1982

Miscellaneous filmographyThe Late Late Show With Craig Ferguson  (as himself with his seeing eye dog named Eddison, a German Shepherd). Right after Julie Chen and before Michelle Yeohi. July 30, 2008.Moving Through Space: A Day with Tom Sullivan (composer of song "Idle Hands"), 2003.Good Morning America (as himself – feature correspondent), 1978–1983Super Bowl X (sang "The Star-Spangled Banner" with the cast of Up with People), Jan. 18, 1976Black Sunday (sang "The Star-Spangled Banner" with the cast of Up with People), 1977

BibliographyIf You Could See What I Hear (1975) Tom Sullivan's Adventures In Darkness (1976) The Leading Lady. Dinah's Story (1991, with Betty White) Seeing Lessons: 14 Life Secrets I've Learned Along the Way (2003) Together: A novel of shared vision (2008, with Betty White) Alive Day: A Story of Love and Loyalty'' (2009), with Betty White

References

External links
Tom Sullivan's official website

1947 births
Living people
Male actors from Boston
American male composers
20th-century American composers
20th-century American male musicians
21st-century American composers
21st-century American male musicians
American male film actors
American motivational speakers
American motivational writers
American male television actors
Blind musicians
People from West Roxbury, Boston
Blind actors
Blind singers